Magnus Søndenå (born 9 October 1991) is a Norwegian handball player for Ribe-Esbjerg HH and the Norwegian national team.

References

1991 births
Living people
Norwegian male handball players
People from Sandefjord
Sportspeople from Vestfold og Telemark